In the southwestern United States, a ramada is a temporary or permanent shelter equipped with a roof but no walls, or only partially enclosed.

Ramadas have traditionally been constructed with branches or bushes by aboriginal Americans living in the region (deriving from the Spanish rama, meaning "branch").  However, the term today is also applied to permanent concrete, wooden, or steel structures used to shelter objects or people from the sun.  For example, public parks in desert areas of the United States may contain ramadas with picnic tables, restrooms, water sources, etc.  Since sunlight is more of an environmental hazard than wind or snow or rain in this part of the world, a roof alone provides substantial shelter.  And because there are no walls in the structure, airflow is unrestricted, helping to keep the temperature below the roof substantially cooler than ambient.

An example of a large modern-day ramada can be seen at the Casa Grande Ruins National Monument in Arizona, where it is used to protect ancient ruins.

External links
 Hohokam Indians of the Tucson Basin

Huts

Traditional Native American dwellings